Porsa is a river in the municipality of Hammerfest in Troms og Finnmark county, Norway. Two hydroelectric power stations, Nedre and Øvre Porsa, are located in the river, with a total installed capacity of 15.3 MW.

References

Rivers of Troms og Finnmark
Kvalsund
Hammerfest